Omar Narváez may refer to:

 Omar Narváez (boxer) (born 1975), Argentine boxer
 Omar Narváez (baseball) (born 1992), Venezuelan baseball catcher